Jasmere.com was a deal-of-the-day website with a format similar to Groupon.com.

Jasmere sold merchandise from upscale though lesser-known vendors. It offered discounts of 50-70% off the regular retail prices. E-mail alerts were sent daily stating that day's deal, which lasts for 24 hours until the next deal starts.

Jasmere was founded in 2009 in Silver Spring, Maryland and has been featured in numerous local TV news segments.

Pricing model
Jasmere has been noted for its “anti-auction” feature, by which the price reduces as more people purchase the item with all purchasers paying the final price.

References

Deal of the day services
Internet properties established in 2009
Online retailers of the United States
Sales promotion